Oreste Baratieri (né Oreste Baratter, 13 November 1841 – 7 August 1901) was an Italian general and governor of Italian Eritrea.

Early career

Born in Condino (County of Tyrol, now Trentino), Baratieri began his career as a volunteer for Giuseppe Garibaldi's Redshirts, where he served during the Expedition of the Thousand from 1860 to 1861. Following the unification of Italy, Baratieri did fight in the Battle of Mentana (1867) then he pursued a military career joining the regular Italian Army and fighting at the Battle of Custoza on 24 June 1866. Rising to the rank of general by 1891, Baratieri was appointed commander of Italian forces in colonial Africa and the following year became governor of Eritrea. Baratieri would spend several years fighting with local Ethiopian forces along the border from 1893 to 1895, winning several victories over the Mahdists, particularly at the Battle of Kassala on 17 July 1894.

Italo-Ethiopian War
Following Ethiopian Emperor Menelik II and Italy's dispute over the Treaty of Wuchale, Italy launched an invasion of the Ethiopian Empire. Returning briefly to Italy, Baratieri reportedly promised crowds to bring back Menelik in a cage. In late 1895 Baratieri led a force of 25,000 Italian troops and Eritrean Ascari into Ethiopia.

However, Menelik had spent several years re-equipping his soldiers with modern arms and ammunition for such a conflict—at times with Italian help—and called up an army that vastly outnumbered the Italian forces. Baratieri spent nearly a year of the First Italo–Ethiopian War evading a decisive confrontation. In February 1896, however, the impatient Italian government of Francesco Crispi ordered Baratieri to engage the Ethiopians. Unknown to Baratieri, a confidential Cabinet decision had been made to replace him, and his successor General Baldissera was already on his way to Eritrea.

On the evening of 28 February 1896 Baratieri met in conference with his four Brigade commanders at Sauria. The general himself favored a partial withdrawal, noting that the Ethiopian forces under Menelik were believed to be short of supplies and would be obliged soon to disperse. However both his brigadiers and his orders from Rome insisted on an advance into mountainous territory.

On 29 February Baratieri marched in four separate columns on the Ethiopians at Adowa, where they outnumbered his immediate command of 9,894 men by more than ten to one. The fighting began soon after 5:30 am on 1 March, when a horseman entered the Ethiopian camp with news of the Italian advance. Ethiopian forces were well positioned to receive the Italians in a crossfire, and by noon the battle was effectively over. Around 14,660 Italian regulars and Eritrean Ascaris were killed during the war compared to an estimated 7,000 Ethiopians, Baratieri's casualties accounted for two-thirds of his force. As a result of the disaster, Italy was forced to sign the humiliating Treaty of Addis Ababa guaranteeing Ethiopian sovereignty.

Baratieri was court-martialed at Asmara; though he was acquitted, he was forced to resign his post the following year. He spent the remainder of his life living in retirement in the Austrian Tyrol until his death on 7 August 1901 at Sterzing.

References

External links
 

1841 births
1901 deaths
People from Trentino
People from the County of Tyrol
Historical Right politicians
Deputies of Legislature XIII of the Kingdom of Italy
Deputies of Legislature XIV of the Kingdom of Italy
Deputies of Legislature XV of the Kingdom of Italy
Deputies of Legislature XVI of the Kingdom of Italy
Deputies of Legislature XVII of the Kingdom of Italy
Deputies of Legislature XVIII of the Kingdom of Italy
Deputies of Legislature XIX of the Kingdom of Italy
Italian colonial governors and administrators
Italian generals
19th-century Italian military personnel
Italian people of the Italian unification
Italian military personnel of the First Italo-Ethiopian War
Members of the Expedition of the Thousand
19th century in Ethiopia